The Soueast DX5 is a compact crossover designed by Pininfarina and manufactured by Chinese automaker Soueast Motors.

Overview

The Soueast DX5 was launched during the 2019 Chengdu Auto Show, The Soueast DX5 is based on the same platform as the DX3 and slots between the DX3 and DX7 in size. Stying wise, the DX5 is designed by Pininfarina. The DX5 was launched with a total of six variants with a pre-sale price range of 69,900 to 99,900 yuan (~US$9,774 – US$13,969).

Powertrain
The DX5 is powered by a selection of 1.5 liter engine and a 1.5 liter turbo engine. The 1.5 liter engine produces 120 hp and the 1.5 liter turbo engine produces 156 hp. Transmission options are a 5-speed manual transmission, a 6-speed automatic transmission, and a 8-speed simulating CVT.

References

External links 

 Soueast DX5 website

DX5
Crossover sport utility vehicles
Front-wheel-drive vehicles
2010s cars
Cars introduced in 2019
Cars of China